Proteuxoa restituta is a moth of the family Noctuidae. It is found in the Australian Capital Territory, New South Wales and Queensland.

The wingspan is about 40 mm. Adults have dark brown patterned forewings, each with a dark comma mark, and pale brown hindwings.

External links
Australian Faunal Directory
Australian Insects

Proteuxoa
Moths of Australia
Moths described in 1852